The women's curling tournament took place at the Vancouver Olympic/Paralympic Centre. The draws took place between 16 and 25 February 2010 and the final took place on 26 February 2010.  All start times are in Pacific Standard Time (UTC-8). The preliminary round was a round-robin tournament between all 10 teams; the top four qualified for the medal round.

Teams
The teams are listed as follows:

*Throws second rocks

**The World Curling Federation had Olga Jarkova listed as the Third. However, a press release by the Vancouver Organizing Committee has Anna Sidorova listed as Third.

***On Feb 21, 2010, Debbie McCormick switched to throwing third, with Allison Pottinger throwing fourth.

Standings
Standings after the preliminary round.  Top four qualified for the medal round.

Results
Results of the preliminary round.

Draws

Draw 1

Tuesday, February 16, 2:00 PM

Draw 2
Wednesday, February 17, 9:00 AM

Draw 3
Wednesday, February 17, 7:00 PM

Draw 4
Thursday, February 18, 2:00 PM

Draw 5
Friday, February 19, 9:00 AM

Draw 6
Friday, February 19, 7:00 PM

Draw 7

Saturday, February 20, 2:00 PM

Draw 8
Sunday, February 21, 9:00 AM

Draw 9

Sunday, February 21, 7:00 PM

Draw 10
Monday, February 22, 2:00 PM

Draw 11
Tuesday, February 23, 9:00 AM

Draw 12
Tuesday, February 23, 7:00 PM

Medal Round

Semifinals
Thursday, February 25, 9:00 AM

Bronze medal final
Friday, February 26, 9:00 AM

Gold medal final
Friday, February 26, 3:00 PM

References

External links 
 Curling at the Vancouver 2010 official website 

Women's tournament
Women's tournament
2010 in women's curling
2010 in Canadian women's sports
Women's curling competitions in Canada
Women's events at the 2010 Winter Olympics